Rewind is the debut album by Hexstatic, released on Ntone (sister label to Ninja Tune) in March 2000. The album cover features a 1980 home computer, the Sinclair ZX80.

Track listing
 "Rewind Intro"
 "Communication Break-Down"
 "Deadly Media"
 "Ninja Tune"
 "Kids Can Dance"
 "Robopop"
 "Vector"
 "The Horn"
 "Auto"
 "Machine Toy"
 "Bass Invader"

The vinyl version of the album contains two additional tracks:
 "Timber" (Hardwood Mix)
 "Robopop" (Cyclon Attack Mix)

References

Hexstatic albums
2000 debut albums
Ntone albums